The Weepecket Islands are a group of three islands which are part of the Elizabeth Islands of Dukes County, Massachusetts, United States. They are located off the north shore of Naushon Island, the largest of the Elizabeth Islands. Together the three Weepeckets have a land area of 0.051 km2 (0.02 sq mi, or 12.6 acres). The islands were used as a United States Navy practice target range (the Weepecket Island Bomb Area) for bombs, rockets, and machine guns from 1941 to 1957.

Today, the islands are uninhabited. and are a popular breeding ground for double-crested cormorants.

See also
 List of military installations in Massachusetts

References

Elizabeth Islands
Uninhabited islands of Massachusetts
Coastal islands of Massachusetts